Jitendra Narayan Dash (birth 3 August 1953), who writes under the pseudonym of Dash Benhur is a Sahitya Akademi award winner writer from Odisha. He was born in Khandapada in Nayagarh district, Odisha.
He retired as the Principal of Samanta Chandra Sekhara College, Puri. He is a founder member of Aama Odisha.

Works 
He is the author of more than 100 books, including 15 collections of short-stories.

Children's literature

 The Puduga king & other stories, 2013
 Unforgettable Stories, 2007
 A Basket of Stories (Stories), 2005
 The Story of Maita (Novel), 2005
 Manu and the Sparrow (Story), 2001
 Play Fun with Riddles (Riddles), 2001
 My Pet Poetry Book (Poem), 2001
 All Time Rhymes for Children, 2001
 Rhymes for Little Reema, 2001

Short stories
 Kaanduri and Other Stories, 2015
 Gandhi Tales from Odisha, 2013
 Alms and other stories, 2008
 The Tribute and other stories, 2006
 The Drawing and other stories, 1987

Novel
 Pagadi purusha,2 015

Awards 
 Sahitya Akademi Bal Puraskar, 2014 
 Odisha Vigyan Academy Popular Science-writer award, 1999 
 NCERT Prize for Children's Literature,1989
 Odisha Sahitya Academy award, 1987

References 

1953 births
Living people
People from Nayagarh district
Writers from Odisha
Odia-language writers
Odia short story writers
Indian children's writers
Utkal University alumni
Recipients of the Sahitya Akademi Award in Odia
Recipients of the Odisha Sahitya Akademi Award
20th-century Indian short story writers